Joseph P. DeWoody is a US-based businessman, the CEO of Valor Mineral Management, and formerly president of Clear Fork Royalty, an oil and gas mineral rights and royalty acquisition company.

Early life and education
DeWoody grew up in Fort Worth, Texas and attended Southwest Christian School and graduated with his bachelor's degree in Entrepreneurship from Baylor University in 2005. He earned an MBA in Finance from Baylor University in 2006.

At Baylor University, DeWoody was awarded academic all-conference honors and the 2004 Offensive Lineman of the Year award for his performance in the university football team.

Career
In 2006, DeWoody joined his family's exploration and production company, Pendragon Oil, and is still a managing member of the company. He then founded Clear Fork Royalty in 2009, an oil and gas mineral rights and royalty acquisition company through which he has acquired interests in over 250 counties in 26 states in the US.

During the course of his career, the Texas governor, Rick Perry, appointed DeWoody to the Texas Board of Professional Geoscientists for a six-year term. He serves on the Boards of Directors of National Stripper Well Association and has served previously on the Boards of the Texas Alliance of Energy Producers, and the Oil information Library of Fort Worth.

After starting his career as a businessman, DeWoody has participated in multiple civic and community organizations. He is a member of the Fort Worth Stock Show Syndicate. He is also a member of Fort Worth Wildcatter's, the Botanical Research Institute of Texas, and board member of University of North Texas Health Science Center Foundation. DeWoody is a member, and formerly served on the board of directors, of the Baylor "B" Association. He was named by Maverick PAC as future 40 award winner in 2015. He was awarded Oil and Gas Investor Magazine's 20 under 40 in Exploration and Production Award, TIPRO's Texas Top Producer Top Landman Award and also named by Fort Worth Business Press as a Forty Under Forty Award Winners.

References

External links

American businesspeople in the oil industry
Year of birth missing (living people)
Living people